FC Rodange 91 is a football club based in Rodange, Luxembourg.

History
The club was founded in 1991 as a merger between Rodange sides FC Chiers (founded in 1907) and FC Racing (1931). Chiers had played fourteen seasons in the Luxembourg National Division between 1938 and 1980 and Racing seven between 1946 and 1956. Racing also reached the final of the Luxembourg Cup in 1949, where it lost 1–0 to Stade Dudelange.

Merger club FC Rodange 91 reached the National Division for the first time in 1995, but was relegated back to the second tier- Luxembourg Division of Honour after the 1996/97 season. FC Rodange 91 then played two more seasons in the top tier, in 2000/01 and 2017/18 before returning to the highest level in 2019.

At the end of the 2020/21 season, the club moved to play their home games at the Stade Municipal of Union Titus Pétange because its own Stade Jos Philippart was to be renovated. A new grandstand was also built.

Current squad

References

External links
  FC Rodange 91 official website

Football clubs in Luxembourg
Association football clubs established in 1991
FC Rodange 91